Kristian Lønstad Onsrud (born 22 July 1994) is a Norwegian footballer who plays as a midfielder for HamKam.

Career
Onsrud played youth football at Gjøvik-Lyn, before starting his senior career with Raufoss in 2012. After six seasons with Raufoss, he moved to HamKam in 2018. On 2 April 2022, he made his Eliteserien debut in a 2–2 draw against Lillestrøm.

References

External links

1994 births
Living people
Sportspeople from Gjøvik
Association football midfielders
Norwegian footballers
Raufoss IL players
Hamarkameratene players
Norwegian Second Division players
Norwegian First Division players
Eliteserien players